Robert Löhr (born 17 January 1973) is a German novelist and screenwriter. He is best known for his  novel Der Schachautomat, translated into English by Anthea Bell as The Chess Machine. (The Secrets of the Chess Machine in the UK). His work has been largely collected by libraries.

Life and career
Robert Löhr was born in Berlin and brought up in Bremen and Santa Barbara, California. He went to journalism school in Berlin and studied North American and German literature at the Free University of Berlin before attending the Deutsche Film- und Fernsehakademie Berlin to become a screenwriter.

Starting in 2005, he has written four historical novels on topics such as the chess-playing turk, the fabled Sängerkrieg and the friendship of Goethe and Schiller.

Bibliography
 Der Schachautomat, Piper, Munich 2005. 
 Das Erlkönig-Manöver, Piper, Munich 2007. 
 Das Hamlet-Komplott, Piper, Munich 2010. 
 Krieg der Sänger, Piper, Munich 2012. 
 Erika Mustermann, Piper, Munich 2013.

References 
John David Pizer (2011): Imagining the Age of Goethe in German Literature, 1970-2010. Camden House. .

External links 
 
 www.robert-loehr.de

German male novelists
1973 births
Living people
Free University of Berlin alumni
Writers from Berlin
German screenwriters
German male screenwriters
21st-century German novelists
21st-century German male writers
21st-century German screenwriters